The United States Secretary of Labor is a member of the Cabinet of the United States, and as the head of the United States Department of Labor, controls the department, and enforces and suggests laws involving unions, the workplace, and all other issues involving any form of business-person controversies.

Formerly, there was a Department of Commerce and Labor. That department split into two in 1913. The Department of Commerce is headed by the secretary of commerce.

Secretary of labor is a Level I position in the Executive Schedule, thus earning a salary of US$221,400, as of January 2021.

Julie Su has been serving as acting secretary since the resignation of Marty Walsh on March 11, 2023.

List of secretaries of labor
 Parties
 (13)
 (16)

Status

Line of succession 
The line of succession for the Secretary of Labor is as follows:
 Deputy Secretary of Labor
Solicitor of Labor
 Assistant Secretary for Administration and Management
 Assistant Secretary for Policy
 Assistant Secretary for Congressional and Intergovernmental Affairs
 Assistant Secretary for Employment and Training
 Assistant Secretary for Employee Benefits Security
 Assistant Secretary for Occupational Safety and Health
 Assistant Secretary for Mine Safety and Health
 Assistant Secretary for Public Affairs
 Chief Financial Officer
 Administrator, Wage and Hour Division
 Assistant Secretary for Veterans' Employment and Training
 Assistant Secretary for Disability Employment Policy
 Deputy Solicitor of Labor (First Assistant of the Solicitor of Labor)
 Deputy Assistant Secretary for Policy (First Assistant of the Assistant Secretary for Policy)
 Deputy Assistant Secretary for Congressional Affairs (First Assistant of the Assistant Secretary for Congressional and Intergovernmental Affairs)
 Deputy Assistant Secretary for Employment and Training (First Assistant of the Assistant Secretary for Employment and Training)
 Deputy Assistant Secretary for Policy (First Assistant of the Assistant Secretary for Employee Benefits Security)
 Deputy Assistant Secretary for Occupational Safety and Health (First Assistant of the Assistant Secretary for Occupational Safety and Health)
 Deputy Assistant Secretary for Mine Safety and Health (First Assistant of the Assistant Secretary for Mine Safety and Health)
 Regional Solicitor—Dallas
 Regional Administrator for the Office of the Assistant Secretary for Administration and Management—Region VI/Dallas

Secretary succession 
If none of the above officials are available to serve as Acting Secretary of Labor, the Designated Secretarial Designee assumes interim operational control over the Department, except the Secretary's non-delegable responsibilities.
 Director, Office of Federal Contract Compliance Programs
 Director of the Women's Bureau
 Regional Administrator, Employment and Training Administration—Dallas
 Regional Administration, Occupational Safety and Health Administration—Dallas

See also
United States Deputy Secretary of Labor
United States Department of Labor Office of Inspector General

References

External links

 

|-

Labor

Labor
1913 establishments in the United States